Dr. Seuss' The Lorax: Original Songs from the Motion Picture and Dr. Seuss' The Lorax: Original Motion Picture Score are the albums released for the 2012 computer-animated musical fantasy comedy film The Lorax (2012), based on Dr. Seuss's children's book of the same name. The first album consisted of several original songs written for the film, released on February 21, 2012 by Interscope Records. The second album consisted of original score composed by John Powell and released on February 28 by Back Lot Music.

Dr. Seuss' The Lorax: Original Songs from the Motion Picture

Background 
Besides composing the film score, John Powell composed and wrote the original tracks with Cinco Paul, one of the film's screenwriters. Tricky Stewart served as the executive producer for the soundtrack. The producer Chris Meledandri, revealed that the inspiration of using songs, came directly from Dr. Seuss, as the animated version of The Grinch – embraced the use of songs in an unconventional way. He further revealed this in an interview to Collider:"The use of music, in this film, is very unconventional, which I love. When you listen to the music in this film, it's working on the level of melody, but the other key element is lyrics. There are a number of songs in the film where the lyrics themselves are very much speaking to the essence of what Ted Geisel was setting out to do. Songs give you incredible opportunity to convey a tremendous amount in a relatively short period of time".
The lead single from the film, titled "Let It Grow" was sung by Ester Dean. Stewart wanted Dean to rope her for the song, as "from a subject matter standpoint, the song would be something that she would want to be involved with. Because of the message in The Lorax and the type of person that Ester is, those are the type of things that really mean something to her". He further stated about the song: "The song was a light-hearted version of what the film is about. But at the same time there is a seriousness to the message of the record. We take all those things into consideration: getting that message out there of what is going on in the environment, and not only what's going on in the environment, but what's going on with us as people. And I think that she was able to lyrically nail that soft spot in people, to tug on their heart strings a little bit, to make people walk out and maybe think about doing something nice, or think about doing something different than what they do on a daily basis. Just to do something good for the environment and good for your fellow person".

Reception 
Critical reception to the soundtrack was mixed. Kyle Smith of New York Post, panned the film's music, referring to the songs as "musical rants". Film critic A. O. Scott of The New York Times said that the film's silliness is "loud and slightly hysterical, as if young viewers could be entertained only by a ceaseless barrage of sensory stimulus and pop-culture attitude, or instructed by songs that make the collected works of Up With People sound like Metallica". The Hollywood Reporter critics felt that the songs "did not quite hit the desired chord".

In contrast, Variety's Justin Chang opined that the songs "are genial and loopy enough to give the film something of a Seussical sensibility". James Christopher Monger of AllMusic wrote: "The main songs, "Let It Grow", "Everybody Needs a Thneed", and "Thneedville", like the film itself, are subversive and silly, incorporating dance, pop, and rock elements while maintaining the general weirdness of a tree-hugging, mustachioed monster helping a 12-year-old boy land the girl of his dreams, but they could have easily been integrated into the orchestral version of the soundtrack".

Track listing

Charts

Awards and nominations

Dr. Seuss' The Lorax: Original Motion Picture Score 

John Powell composed the musical score for the film, after he previously scored the animated Seuss adaptation of Horton Hears a Who! (2008) produced by Blue Sky Studios. The score was released by Back Lot Music on February 28, 2012.

Reception 
James Christopher Monger of Allmusic wrote: "Powell's deft blend of old-school orchestral grandeur and modern bombast yields some splendid fruit here, channeling the whimsy of Randy Newman, the joy of Alan Silvestri, and the mad fancy of Danny Elfman without ever breaking a sweat". Filmtracks.com wrote: "A strong balance of action, fantasy, and tragedy is conveyed by Powell in this score, though its tone is really too disparate from that of the songs to form a truly cohesive whole [...] The score-only product, on the other hand, is a decent listening experience and has roughly fifteen minutes of music that will fit nicely with Powell's similarly friendly but somewhat forgettable children's writing. If you are stuck watching the film, at least you will hear the debut of Brian Tyler's reworking of Jerry Goldsmith's Universal logo music at the outset, arguably a more interesting attraction than what follows".

Track listing

Awards and nominations

Notes

References 

2012 soundtrack albums
Interscope Records soundtracks
Back Lot Music soundtracks
John Powell (film composer) soundtracks
Film scores